Phaeochlaena lampra is a moth of the family Notodontidae first described by Louis Beethoven Prout in 1918. It is found from south-eastern Brazil south to Uruguay, Paraguay and north-eastern Argentina.

The larvae feed on Solanum species.

References

Moths described in 1871
Notodontidae of South America